Betty Ann Bobbitt (February 7, 1939 – November 30, 2020) was an American actress, director, singer, and playwright based in Australia, with a career that spanned over 60 years, encompassing theatre, television, and film. 
  
Bobbitt was best known for her small screen role in TV series Prisoner (known in the UK and North America as Prisoner: Cell Block H and Caged Woman in Canada) as lesbian mother figure Judy Bryant from 1980 to 1985, through 430 episodes.
 
Bobbitt was the second major star actress to portray a lesbian character in the series after Carol Burns, who played original character Franky Doyle.  
 
In the series the character of Judy was convicted of smuggling drugs so she could be with her lesbian lover Sharon Gilmore in the fictional Wentworth Detention Centre, whilst in prison she was raped, survived a murder attempt, broke out on two occasions and discovered she had a long lost daughter.
 
The actress who portrays Judy Bryant's lover in the series Margot Knight, as inmate Sharon Gilmore, returned to the series for a second stint as Prison Officer Terri Malone, coincidently also a lesbian character, this time to regular character Joan Ferguson (Maggie Kirkpatrick),  making Knight the only actress to portray an LGBT character as both a prisoner and warden.
 
On film she had cameo roles appearing opposite Paul Hogan, in several of the Crocodile Dundee series including Crocodile Dundee II (1988), Crocodile Dundee in Los Angeles (2001), and the direct-to-video The Very Excellent Mr. Dundee (2020).

Bobbitt died on 30 November 2020, aged 81, following a stroke.

Early career in the United States and Australia

Bobbitt was born in Manhattan, New York, to nurse Elizabeth Bobbitt née Sprout and Hubert Bobbitt, a steel mill worker and grew up in Norristown, a suburb of Philadelphia. She attended a Catholic school and Norristown High School.

Moving at aged 18 to Los Angeles for a theatre production of Auntie Mame, she was approached by an Australian television producer who asked her if she "wanted to come to Australia and be funny". She was contracted for six months and appeared as a regular on a Melbourne television variety show, Daly at Night, as "a female Victor Borge, singing off-key and just plain acting like a dumb brunette". She was known in Australia in the early 1960s as "Betty Bobbitt the dizzy brunette from Big Bear", referencing a fictitious place ostensibly in Pennsylvania.

She subsequently married an Australian artist, Robin Hill, and had a son, Christopher, in England. Returning to Melbourne, Australia, she appeared in many theatre productions with the Melbourne Theatre Company. She also teamed up with future Prisoner stars Anne Phelan and Colette Mann in a 1970s stage show called The Glitter Girls who performed  1940s songs. Notable theatre included in Martin Cripps Cruel and Tender and Jean Cocteau of 'The Human Voice

Television productions

Bobbitt was a fixture on Australian television from the mid-1960s with guest roles in serials including Matlock Police, Homicide, Cop Shop, A Country Practice, The Flying Doctors, All Saints, Marshall Law, and  Blue Heelers.

Prisoner: Cell Block H

She became best known for her role in Prisoner for her portrayal of lesbian character Judy Bryant, a series regular. She first appeared in the show in February 1980. After it started to gain a cult status in the US, billed as Prisoner: Cell Block H, an American actress was suggested by producers as a nod to local audiences. Her character was intended only for a short-term 13 episode appearance, but she became immensely popular, and was retained in the series. Bobbitt continued in the role until May 1985, making her the show's second-longest serving actor, at 429 episodes, second only to Elspeth Ballantyne as officer Meg Jackson/Morris, an original who appeared at the series' inception. After Prisoner, she continued in theatre roles and made guest appearance in television and film

During her time in Prisoner Bobbitt performed with fellow Prisoner cast members Jane Clifton and Colette Mann in a three-woman troupe named "The Mini Busettes" in the 1980s. They performed around Australia in RSL and similar clubs.
 
Bobbitt appeared in a guest role in TV series Neighbours in 2019, to celebrate the 40th Anniversary of Prisoner, she featured alongside fellow stars Jane Clifton, Jentah Sobott and Jenny Lovell, who arrive in Erinsborough to attend Sheila's Bookclub, in doing so she was reunited with other Prisoner co-stars who now star in the series, Colette Mann, who plays regular Sheila Canning and Jackie Woodburne who has long played Susan Kennedy.

Film

She had cameo roles in the Crocodile Dundee franchise starring Paul Hogan including Crocodile Dundee II and Crocodile Dundee in Los Angeles (a.k.a.Crocodile Dundee III) and The Very Excellent Mr. Dundee.

In 2004, Bobbitt made a brief uncredited appearance in the American television remake of the Stephen King classic, Salem's Lot, and in 2010 in a thriller, Torn.

Publication
In 2011, Bobbitt self-published her book From the Outside, which documents her life and career playing the role of Judy Bryant on Prisoner.

Filmography

Film

Television

References

External links 
 
Hear Betty talk about her life and career on The Soap Show 
Interview with Betty Bobbitt
 Betty Bobbitt official website 

1939 births
2020 deaths
Actresses from New York City
Australian film actresses
Australian people of American descent
Australian soap opera actresses
Australian stage actresses
People from Manhattan
People from Norristown, Pennsylvania
20th-century Australian actresses
21st-century Australian singers
21st-century Australian actresses
21st-century American actresses